Dragon's Breath Cave was discovered by Roger Ellis during a caving expedition to the area in 1986. It is named for the moist air rising from its entrance which resembled the breath of a Dragon. 

The cave contains the world's largest non-subglacial underground lake, with an area of almost . Although it has been reported that the rare fish species, Clarias cavernicola, lives in the lake in the Dragon's Breath Cave, this is an error. It is only known from the nearby Aigamas Cave.

Martyn Farr records in his book "The Darkness Beckons" the exploration of the cave by a team of divers and cavers lead by Roger Ellis and Charles Maxwell of the South African Spelaeological Association a year after the cave was identified in 1986 by cavers as being of significant size.

See also
 
 , a project based on another fossil water store in an arid area in Africa

References

External links
 Discovery Channel: Video: Dragon's Breath Cave
 (af) Nuwe duikrekord opgestel ("New dive record set", Republikein, 13 June 2012. URL accessed on 20 October 2015.
 (af) Dieper die aarde se maag in ("Deeper into the bowels of the earth"), Republikein, 13 July 2012. URL accessed on 20 October 2015.

Underground lakes
Caves of Namibia
Lakes of Namibia